Melinaea is a genus of clearwing (ithomiine) butterflies. They are in the brush-footed butterfly family, Nymphalidae.

Species
Arranged alphabetically:
Melinaea ethra (Godart, 1819)
Melinaea idae (Felder & Felder, 1862)
Melinaea isocomma Forbes, 1948
Melinaea lilis (Doubleday, 1847)
Melinaea ludovica (Cramer, [1780])
Melinaea marsaeus (Hewitson, 1860)
Melinaea menophilus (Hewitson, 1856) – Hewitson's tiger
Melinaea mnasias (Hewitson, 1856)
Melinaea mneme (Linnaeus, 1763)
Melinaea mnemopsis Berg, 1897
Melinaea satevis (Doubleday, 1847)

References

Ithomiini
Nymphalidae of South America
Nymphalidae genera
Taxa named by Jacob Hübner